Apollonius of Drepanum or Drepana (modern Trapani), son of Nicon, was a man of Sicily of the 1st century BCE. He was a profligate but wealthy person, who had accumulated great treasures by robbing orphans of their property, and was spoiled in his turn by Verres. He obtained the Roman franchise, and then received the Roman name of A. Clodius.

Notes

1st-century BC Romans
People from Trapani